The Bangladesh Free Trade Union Congress (BFTUC) is a national federation of trade unions in Bangladesh. It was established in 1983. It is affiliated with the International Trade Union Confederation.

References

National trade union centres of Bangladesh
International Trade Union Confederation
Trade unions established in 1983
Labour relations in Bangladesh